Charles Bouvet (17 October 1918 – 26 May 2005) was a French athlete. He competed in the men's pole vault at the 1948 Summer Olympics.

References

1918 births
2005 deaths
Athletes (track and field) at the 1948 Summer Olympics
French male pole vaulters
Olympic athletes of France
Place of birth missing